Colegas is a Spanish dramedy streaming television series directed by Peris Romano which stars Manuel Feijóo, Julián González, Lara de Miguel, Fernando Gil and Marta Solaz, among others. Produced by RTVE Digital and Hill Valley Producciones, it was released from 2017 to 2018 on playz.

Premise 
The fiction, a dramedy, tracks a group of people who reunite 20 years after becoming popular as performers in a fictional television series, Colegas. It makes recurring nods to teen drama titles such as Compañeros or Al salir de clase, in which the real-life actors who perform exaggerated version of themselves actually starred.

Cast 
Main
  as Manu.
  as Julián
  as Dani
  as Rafa
  as Lara
  as Fernando Will.i.am Gil.
  as Marta
 Soy una pringada, as Patetic-girl.
 Javi Coll as Rasty Palacios.
 Enrique Villén as Villén, Manu's manager.
 Rodrigo Poisón as Machete.
 .
Other and cameos
  as Señor Romano.
 Víctor Clavijo
 Lucía Jiménez
 Eva Santolaria.
 William Miller.

Production and release 
Produced by RTVE Digital in collaboration with Hill Valley Producciones, Colegas was shot in locations across the Madrid region and the province of Ávila. Directed by Peris Romano, it consists of 6 episodes with a running time of around 20 minutes. RTVE released the pilot on 30 October 2017, as part of the launch of the Playz platform together with the release of the pilots of Dorien and Mambo. The broadcasting run resumed on 13 February 2018, with a weekly release on Tuesday.

References 

2010s Spanish comedy television series
2010s Spanish drama television series
Spanish comedy-drama television series
2010s comedy-drama television series
2017 Spanish television series debuts
2018 Spanish television series endings
Playz original programming
Spanish-language television shows
Television shows filmed in Spain